I cavalieri dalle maschere nere (I Beati Paoli) (also known as The Knights of the Black Masks and The Sect of the Hooded) is a 1948 Italian adventure film directed by Pino Mercanti and starring Otello Toso and Lea Padovani.

The film grossed over 100 million lire at the Italian box office.

Plot

Cast 
 Otello Toso as Blasco di Castiglione
Lea Padovani as Violante
Massimo Serato as Young Count de la Motte
Paola Barbara as Madame de la Motte
Mario Ferrari as Count Raimondo de la Motte
Paolo Stoppa as The Stuttering Nobleman
Carlo Ninchi as Duke Coriolano
Michele Abruzzo as Matteo
Umberto Spadaro as Gegè
 Rosolino Bua as The Abbott

References

External links

1948 adventure films
1948 films
Italian adventure films
Films directed by Pino Mercanti
Films set in Sicily
Films set in the 1710s
Italian black-and-white films
1940s Italian films